In Wotjobaluk mythology, Gnowee is a solar goddess whose torch is the Sun.  She was once a woman who lived upon the Earth at a time when it was eternally dark, and people could only move about with the aid of bark torches. One day, she left her little son sleeping while she went out to dig for yams. Food was scarce, and Gnowee wandered so far that she reached the end of the Earth, passed under it and emerged on the other side. Not knowing where she was, she could not find her little son anywhere, so she climbed into the sky with her great bark torch to get a clearer view.  She still wanders the sky to this day, lighting the whole world with her torch as she continues to search for her lost son.

See also
Wuriupranili
List of solar deities

References

Australian Aboriginal goddesses
Solar goddesses
Wergaia